Adrian Flannelly (born 5 July 1942) is an Irish broadcaster.

Biography 
Flannelly was born in Attymass, County Mayo, Ireland.

Irish radio
Flannelly has presented a mix of interviews, music, commentary and chat since 1970. Flannelly has been dedicated to raising issues of concern to the American Irish community. He helped to secure and deliver tens of thousands of visa lottery applications and has been a dedicated advocate for the reform of U.S. immigration laws. His efforts on behalf of applicants during the Donnelly and Morrison visa programs resulted in legalizing thousands of undocumented Irish in the 80s and 90s. Flannelly continues to use his popular radio show to push for reform.

In 2021 Flanelly's work was recognised by the Irish Government by the award of the Presidential Distinguished Service Award in Irish Community Support.

Family life
Flannelly is partners in the show and in irishradio.com with his wife and executive vice president, Aine Sheridan. He now resides in Long Beach, New York. Adrian has launched a campaign that will impact 
Irish Americans for century’s. His family continues to reiterate that message, his children Eileen, Linda, Paul and Kathleen along with grandchildren Falynn and Gavin. Adrians family are name-stays in the Irish echo, voice and community. Along with healthy members of the press, Hibernians, families and 26 United counties of Ireland.

References

Living people
Irish broadcasters
1942 births
People from County Mayo
21st-century Irish journalists